Robert or Bob Farmer may refer to:

Bob Farmer (born 1947), Australian rules footballer
Robert Farmer (ice hockey) (born 1991), British ice hockey forward
Robert Farmer (Paralympian), Australian Paralympic lawn bowler
Bob Farmer, columnist for the magazine Genii
Robert Farmer (officer), commandant at Fort de Chartres, see List of commandants of the Illinois Country
Robert Farmer (American football) (born 1974), NFL player
Robert L. Farmer, member of the North Carolina House of Representatives